Amerigo Vespucci was a screw corvette of the Italian  (Royal Navy) built in the late 1870s and early 1880s.

Design
The design for Amerigo Vespucci was prepared by the naval engineer Carlo Vigna, who also designed the similar corvette . The Italian navy still largely relied on a fleet of old wooden-hulled cruising ships built in the 1850s and 1860s, but by the 1870s, the world's navies had begun to move to steel construction. The Italians responded with Flavio Gioia and Amerigo Vespucci as part of a modest program to modernize its cruising fleet. The two vessels were similar enough that some sources consider them to have been the same class, though others consider them to be distinct designs.

The ship had a traditional clipper bow and an overhanging stern. Her superstructure was minimal, consisting primarily of a small conning tower placed amidships. She had a crew of 268.

Her propulsion system consisted of a single horizontal, 3-cylinder compound steam engine that drove a single screw propeller. Steam was supplied by eight coal-fired fire-tube boilers that vented into a single funnel located amidships. Her propulsion system was manufactured by Gio. The ship had a capacity to store  of coal for the boilers. To supplement the steam engines, she was fitted with a three-masted barque rig.

The main battery for Amerigo Vespucci consisted of eight  26-caliber breech-loading guns, four guns per broadside. For close-range defense against torpedo boats, she carried a secondary battery of three  guns. She was also fitted with four Maxim machine guns of unknown caliber. In 1893, she was rearmed with four  40 cal. guns and two  torpedo tubes.

Service history

Work on Amerigo Vespucci began with her keel laying on 9 December 1879, and her completed hull was launched on 31 July 1882. Fitting out was completed on 1 September 1884. The next year, Amerigo Vespucci took part in the annual fleet maneuvers. The "Eastern Squadron" defended against an attacking "Western Squadron", simulating a Franco-Italian conflict, with operations conducted off Sardinia.

In 1893, the vessel was converted into a training ship; she served in this capacity for more than three decades, though she also filled other roles as well. On 1 October that year, she was assigned to the 3rd Department, which was stationed in Venice. In 1895, Amerigo Vespucci was stationed in Naples and Taranto as a special service ship. In 1899, Amerigo Vespucci was sent to East Asia, again in company with Marco Polo and Elba.

By 1902, Amerigo Vespucci had returned to Italian waters, where she was assigned to the Training Squadron with Flavio Gioia and the gunboat . That year, Flavio Gioia spent ten months in commission for training activities. She embarked on a tour of Europe in company with Curtatone that included stops in Germany, Britain, France, in Spain and concluded with the ships' return to La Spezia, Italy. In October 1904, Amerigo Vespucci and the old wooden screw corvette  visited Toulon, France. The ship remained in service on training duty until she was ultimately discarded on 22 January 1928. Her ultimate fate is unknown.

Notes

References
 
 
 
 
 
 
 
 
 
 
 

1882 ships
Corvettes of the Regia Marina
Ships built in Venice